Euthalia sahadeva, the green duke, is a butterfly of the family Nymphalidae (Limenitidinae). It is found in the Indomalayan realm.<ref>[http://ftp.funet.fi/pub/sci/bio/life/insecta/lepidoptera/ditrysia/papilionoidea/nymphalidae/limenitidinae/euthalia/ " Euthalia  " Hübner, [1819"] at Markku Savela's Lepidoptera and Some Other Life Forms</ref>
SubspeciesE. s. sahadeva Sikkim, BhutanE. s. narayana Grose-Smith & Kirby, 1891 BurmaE. s. nadaka Fruhstorfer, 1913 AssamE. s. thawgawa Tytler, 1940 IndiaE. s. yanagisawai'' Sugiyama, 1996 Yunnan, Sichuan

References

Butterflies described in 1859
sahadeva